Way Out West is a three-day music festival held in Gothenburg, Sweden, during August that plays host to a variety of popular music artists mainly from the rock, electronic and hip-hop genres. The main festival is complemented with the club concept Stay Out West which features after-hours gigs at various venues around the city.

History
The first festival was held in August 2007 in Slottsskogen on Friday and Saturday and at club venues on Thursday, Friday and Saturday nights. In 2012 the festival became a full-fledged three-day festival with live music in Slottsskogen even on Thursday. In addition to music, the festival has also grown to incorporate other cultural activities such as art exhibitions in Slottsskogen and film showings at cinemas around the city.

The festival has had a strong focus on being environmentally friendly and was the first festival in Sweden to become KRAV-certified. Citing environmental reasons, the festival announced on the evening before the first day of the 2012 festival that all food served to artists, staff and visitors during the festival would be vegetarian. This decision led to a furor of reactions, both positive and negative. The debate culminated with the Gothenburg tabloid GT giving away free sausages and meatballs outside the festival entrance – a move that resulted in a Twitter dispute between the festival's press chief Joel Borg, co-founder of the festival, and GT editors that was highlighted by the Swedish media.

The festival has won both national and international awards including: Gyllene Hjulet's 2012 Rights Holder for the Way Out West brand, Résumé's Monthly Outdoor Marketing Campaign, as well as the Most Innovative Festival at the MTV O Music Awards.

Location
The main festival takes place in the 137 hectare Slottsskogen park in central Gothenburg. When the festival area closes for the night there are more performances at various venues in and around central Gothenburg for example Gothenburg Studios.

2007, August 9, 10, 11

Line-up

 ...And You Will Know Us by the Trail of Dead
 Albert Hammond Jr.
 Architecture in Helsinki
 The Ark
 The Besnard Lakes
 Big Bird
 Boredoms
Brian James Gang
 CocoRosie
 Devendra Banhart
 Eagles of Death Metal
 Erykah Badu
 Florence Valentin
 Franke
 Function
 The Go! Team
 The Hellacopters
 Hello Saferide
 The Hives
 Jonas Game
 Juliette and the Licks
 Kanye West
 Koop
 Laakso
 Lady Sovereign
 Laleh
 Last Days of April
 Lily Allen (Show Cancelled (throat infection), Teddybears were the last minute replacement)
 Low
 Lykke Li
 Malajube
 Manu Chao
 Molotov Jive
 Moneybrother
 New Young Pony Club
 Patrick Watson
 Peter Bjorn and John
 The Pogues
 Primal Scream
 Regina Spektor
 Salem Al Fakir
 Shout Out Louds
 Sparta
 Spoon
 Säkert!
 Teenage Bad Girl
 Teddybears (last-minute replacement of Lily Allen)
 Those Dancing Days
 Thunder Express
 Timo Räisänen
 The Tough Alliance
 Voxtrot
 Wovenhand

2008, August 7, 8, 9

Line-up

2009, August 13, 14, 15

Line-up

2010, August 12, 13, 14

Line-up

2011, August 11, 12, 13

Line-up

Slottsskogen
Ariel Pink's Haunted Graffiti
The Avett Brothers
Edward Sharpe and the Magnetic Zeros
Empire of the Sun
Explosions in the Sky
Fleet Foxes
Fake Blood
Anna von Hausswolff
The Hives
Noah and the Whale
iamamiwhoami
Anna Järvinen
The Jayhawks
Christian Kjellvander
Loney Dear
MF Doom
Janelle Monáe
Prince
Pulp
Robyn
Säkert!
Santigold
The Tallest Man on Earth
Thåström
Tiësto
Twin Shadow
Kanye West
Jenny Wilson & Tensta Gospel Choir
Wiz Khalifa
Jamie Woon

Stay Out West (Clubs)

About Group
Mattias Alkberg
Aloe Blacc
James Blake
Butch
Felix Cartal
Russ Chimes
Cloud Control
D/R/U/G/S
Dante
Matthew Dear
Deathcrush
Dem Slackers
Den stora vilan
Destroyer
The Don Darlings
Dundertåget
Nicolai Dunger
Simon Emanuel
Fibes, Oh Fibes
Fucked Up
Wolfgang Gartner
Glass Candy
Glasser
Idiot Wind
Jonathan Johansson
Kissy Sell Out
Koreless
Les Big Byrd
Little Dragon
Low
Jonas Lundqvist
Masquer
Me and My Army
Nina Natri
Off!
Okkervil River
Owl Vision
Pascal
PH3
Planningtorock
Marcus Price (DJ-set)
Puro Instinct
The Radio Dept.
Rebecca & Fiona
Ringo Deathstarr
Safehouse Staff
SBTRKT
Simian Ghost
Heidi Spencer & The Rare Birds
Style of Eye
Syket
Team Rockit
Those Dancing Days
Thulebasen
Timber Timbre
Top Hawk
Totally Enormous Extinct Dinosaurs
Hanna Turi
Twinflower Band
Chad Valley
Chad Vangaalen
Warpaint
Alexis Weak
White Denim
WU LYF
Yuck
Zola Jesus

Source: http://www.wayoutwest.se/

2012, August 9, 10, 11

Line-up

Slottsskogen
Afghan Whigs
ASAP Rocky
Best Coast
The Black Keys
Blur
Bon Iver
Billy Bragg
Ane Brun
Common
De la Soul
Deportees
Feed Me
Feist
The Field
First Aid Kit
Florence + The Machine
I Break Horses
Jean Grae
Anna von Hausswolff
Hot Chip
Ben Howard
Frida Hyvönen
King Krule
Kraftwerk
Laleh
Looptroop Rockers
Mogwai
Nneka
Mark Lanegan Band
Miike Snow
Thurston Moore
Oberhofer
OFWGKTA
Refused
Jonathan Richman
The Royal Concept
St. Vincent
The War on Drugs
Wilco
Yelawolf

Stay Out West (Clubs)

7 Seconds
Alberta Cross
Adolescents
Aleks
Alt-J
Love Antell
Hans Appelqvist
Araabmuzik
Sibille Attar
Bassjackers
Bellaboo
Bobby Tank
Bowerbirds
Boy & Bear
Ceremony
Nadja Chatti
Chromatics
Cloud Nothings
Death Grips
Christian Dinamarca
Division of Laura Lee (DJ-set)
Django Django
Duvchi
Effektverket
Beatrice Eli
Elliphant
El Perro del Mar
The Embassy
Femtastic DJs
Femtastic Soundsystem (Cleo, Frida Scar, Sabina Ddumba)
F.O.O.L.
The Frederik
Friends
Fritjof & Pikänen
Leo Forssell & William Hamilton
Galantis
Genius of Time
Gnucci & VAZ
Grillat & Grändy
Haim
How to Dress Well
Iceage
Anna Ihlis
INGRID
Jacuzzi Boys
Adam Kanyama
Kellermensch
Kill FM
Kill the Noise
Kindness
Kingdom of Evol
King Krule
Korallreven
Lady Chann
Lång-Kalle
Lightships
Lower
Lower Dens
Jonas Lundqvist
Lune
Leo Netz & Noah Gibson
Madeon
John Maus
Mazzy Star
Megafaun
Memoryhouse
Milagres
Sandra Mosh
Bob Mould
MRTN
Museum of Bellas Artes
Nause
Niki & the Dove
Nite Jewel
Noisia
Numbers (Deadboy, Redinho, Oneman, Spencer, Jackmaster)
Owl Vision
Papa M
Josh T. Pearson
Pjotr & Staffan
Purity Ring
Marcus Price
Promoe & Cosmic (DJ-set)
Rambling Nicolas Heron
Refused
Rodriguez
Rudimental
Safari Sound
Sameblod
Sankt Göran
Savages
Sei A
Skriet
John de Sohn
Solander
Stage of Drama
Studio Barnhus
Summercamp
The Suzan
Swedish Tiger & Toffer
Swamp 81 (Pinch, Mickey Pearce, Loefah & McChunky, Boddika)
Swans
Tennis Bafra
TNGHT
Oliver Twizt
Out of Vogue
Vondelpark
Waters
Wayne & Woods
Well Rounded (Donga, James Foxx, XXXY, Leon Vynehall)
Rico Won
Zero Boys
Zhala

Source: http://www.wayoutwest.se/sv/artister

2013, August 8, 9, 10

Line-up

Slottsskogen

Daniel Adams-Ray
Alabama Shakes
Amason
Sibile Attar
Bat for Lashes
Beach House
James Blake
Danny Brown
Crystal Fighters
Cat Power
Ravi Coltrane
Iris Dement
Disclosure
Dungen
Goat
Godspeed You! Black Emperor
Grimes
Haim
Angel Haze
Håkan Hellström
Johnossi
Junip
Jupiter and Okwess International
Alicia Keys
The Knife
Kendrick Lamar
La Yegros
Little Boots
Cheikh Lô
Local Natives
Miguel
Of Monsters and Men
Phosphorescent
Public Enemy
Quadron
Rodriguez
Omar Souleyman
Tame Impala
Ben Zabo

Stay Out West (Clubs)

1991
Acronym
Airhead
AKA
All That Is
Allah-Las
Austra
Autre Ne Veut
Badin
Basement Space
Rikard "Skizz" Bizzi
Mykki Blanco
Zacharias Blad
Bogl & Myka 9
Fabian Bruhn
Cake
Cashmere Cat
Kim Cesarion
Nadja Chatti
Channel 3
Sousou & Maher Cissoko
Maya Jane Coles
Colors
Henric de la Cour
Mikal Cronin
Darwin & Backwall
Deptford Goth
DJ Rashad & DJ Spinn
Ducktails
Easy October
El Perro del Mar (twice)
Electric Wire Hustle
Ulf Eriksson
Evian Christ
Frak
Gerilja
Gnucci
Goran Kajfes Subtropic Arkestra
Graveyard
HKOCHD
Julia Holter
Honningbarna
Daniel Hunt of Ladytron
Jenny Hval
Indians
Ingrid Disco (Lykke Li, Miike Snow, Peter Bjorn and John etc.)
Jagwa Music
Jesaja & Lazee
jj
Johanna Ritscher
Kaah
Kate Boy
Kill FM
Koreless
Kwaai
Kärleksklubben
Könsförrädare
André Laos
Little Jinder
Looptroop Rockers
Lorentz & Sakarias
Lucy Love (twice)
Lune
Mack Beats
Makthaverskan
Mariam the Believer
Steve Mason
Mattias Alkbergs begravning
Max Peezay
Megatron
Merchandise
MF/MB/
Minilogue
Money
Mount Kimbie
Mr. Tophat & Art Alfie
Nils Berg Cinemascope
Norma
The Order
Pissed Jeans
Postiljonen
Taragana Pyrajama
Quiltland
Abdulla Rashim
Porter Robinson
Samlingen (thrice)
Sand Circles
Sankt Göran
Sasha
Say Lou Lou
Shout Out Louds
Skaters
Slugabed
Sohn
Spectrals
Squarehead
The Staves
Stay Positive
Stor, Linda Pira & Salazar Brothers
Studio Barnhus
Summer Heart
Svensk bas
Swim Deeo
Syket
Taken by Trees
These New Puritans
Tigers of the Temple
TM404
Tokimonsta
Trappmusik
Tsol
Unknown Mortal Orchestra
Urban Cone
Varg
Venus X
Villagers
Jenny Wilson
Yast

Azealia Banks, Neil Young & Crazy Horse, and Solange were booked but cancelled their shows.

2014

Line-up

Slottsskogen

Joey Badass
Blood Orange
Brody Dalle
Mark Ernestus presents Jeri-Jeri
The Julie Ruin
Les Ambassadeurs feat Salif Keita, Amadou Bagayoko & Cheick Tidiane Seck
Little Dragon
Janelle Monáe
MØ
The National
Neutral Milk Hotel
Outkast
Pusha T
Queens of the Stone Age
Röyksopp & Robyn
Jenny Wilson

Stay Out West (Clubs)

Circa Waves
Deafheaven
Ella Eyre
Forest Swords
Holly Herndon
Chlöe Howl
Hozier
I Break Horses
Jungle
Lorentz
Machinedrum (DJ-set)
Mighty Oaks
Nguzunguzu
Shlohmo
Jonathan Wilson

2015
Way Out West 2015 was held on August 13 to 15.

2016
Way Out West 2016 was held on August 11 to 13.

2017
Way Out West 2017 was held on August 10 to 12.

2018
Way Out West 2018 was held on August 9 to 11.

2019
Way Out West 2019 was held on August 8 to 10.

References

External links

Photos from Way Out West 2007
Review, setlists and photos from Way Out West 2008 at Webcuts

Music festivals in Sweden
Music in Gothenburg
Tourist attractions in Gothenburg
2007 establishments in Sweden
Electronic music festivals in Sweden
Music festivals established in 2007
Summer events in Sweden